Lazaros Fotias (born 26 April 1991) is a Greek professional footballer who plays as a centre back for Olympos Kerkyra.

Career
He started his career from Iraklis Thessaloniki F.C. (youth academies). On 10 August 2011, he signed a 1+3-years contract with Greek Football League club Larissa after having a successful season with Football League 2 (Greece) team Pontioi Katerini F.C. In July 2012, he moved to Anagennisi Epanomi F.C.  In March 2017, Fotias joined Slovak club Topvar Topoľčany.

In June 2019, Fotias joined Olympos Kerkyra.

References

External links
 

1991 births
Living people
Greek footballers
Association football defenders
Greek expatriate footballers
Greek expatriate sportspeople in Hungary
Greek expatriate sportspeople in Bulgaria
Greek expatriate sportspeople in Slovakia
Greek expatriate sportspeople in Italy
Expatriate footballers in Hungary
Expatriate footballers in Bulgaria
Expatriate footballers in Slovakia
Expatriate footballers in Italy
Athlitiki Enosi Larissa F.C. players
Kaposvári Rákóczi FC players
Super League Greece players
Nemzeti Bajnokság I players
A.P.S. Zakynthos players
Panegialios F.C. players
FC Oborishte players
MFK Topvar Topoľčany players
3. Liga (Slovakia) players
Footballers from Giannitsa